Sinéad is an Irish feminine name. It is derived from the French Jeanette, which is cognate to the English Janet, itself a feminine form of the Hebrew Yohannan, "God forgave/God gratified". In English, Sinéad is also commonly spelled Sinead. The name is generally translated into English as either Jane or Jennifer, or as the Scottish female name Jean.

Notable people and characters with the name include:

People

Sports 
 Sinéad Cahalan, camogie player
 Sinead Farrelly (born 1989), American soccer player
 Sinead Jennings, rower
 Sinead Kerr, ice dancer
 Sinéad Millea, former camogie player
 Sinead Miller, cyclist
 Sinead Russell, Olympic swimmer

Music 
 Sinead Harnett, singer/songwriter
 Sinéad Lohan, singer/songwriter
 Sinéad Madden, singer/songwriter
 Sinéad Mulvey, singer, air hostess
 Sinéad O'Carroll, singer with Irish pop band B*Witched
 Sinéad O'Connor, singer/songwriter
 Sinéad Quinn, recording artist, reality show contestant

Film and television 
 Sinéad Cusack, actress
 Sinead Desmond, TV presenter
 Sinead Keenan, actress
 Sinead Matthews, actress
 Sinéad Moynihan, model and actress
 Sinéad Noonan, model and actress

Other 
 Sinéad Burke, writer, academic, influencer
 Sinéad de Valera, children's book author and wife of Ireland’s first taoiseach
Sinead Farrington, British particle physicist
 Sinéad Gleeson, author and book editor
Sinéad Griffin, Irish physicist
 Sinéad Morrissey, poet
 Sinéad Ní Neachtain, magazine editor
 Sinéad Sheppard, dancer

Fictional characters
 Sinead O'Connor, in the TV series Hollyoaks, played by Stephanie Davis
 Sinead Tinker, in the TV series Coronation Street, played by Katie McGlynn

See also
Siobhán, feminine Irish-language name ultimately derived from the same Hebrew name

References 

Irish feminine given names
Irish-language feminine given names